The Toter Mann near Friedewald in the Hessian county of Hersfeld-Rotenburg is, at , the highest natural hill in the Seulingswald range. This small upland is the southernmost spur of the Fulda-Werra Uplands.

Geography

Location 
The Toter Mann lies in the southernmost part of the Seulingswald. Its summit is 2.5 kilometres north of Friedewald and lies on its municipal territory. Its southwestern hillside lies in the municipality of Kathus, near Solz in the borough of Bad Hersfeld. Its western slopes are in the parish of Meckbach, 3.8 km northwest of the summit, a village on the banks of the Meckbach, a tributary of the Fulda, and in the municipality of Ludwigsau. Its northeastern hillside is in the municipality of Ronshausen, which is traversed by the Fulda tributary of the Ulfe. The Faßdorf estate belonging to Ronshausen in the valley of the Breitenbach lies 4.1 km, as the crow flies, north of the summit.

On the western slopes of the hill rises the Fulda tributary of the Meckbach with its many feeder streams (e.g. the Kirchgrund, Sälig and Finstertal). The Ulfe tributary, the Breitenbach, runs east and north of the hill. On the southwestern slopes, rises the Breitzbach, a tributary of the Solz.

Natural regions 
The Toter Mann is part of the natural region of the Seulingswald (357.20), in the subunit of Solztrotten and Seulingswald (357) in the major unit of the Fulda-Werra Uplands (357) and in the major unit group of the East Hesse Highlands (no. 35).

Footnotes and references 

Mountains and hills of Hesse
Hersfeld-Rotenburg